Novoyakupovo (Yañı Yaqup) is a rural locality (a village) in Kanzafarovsky Selsoviet, Zilairsky District, Bashkortostan, Russia. The population was 26 as of 2010. There is 1 street.

Geography 
Novoyakupovo is located 28 km east of Zilair (the district's administrative centre) by road. Yumaguzhino is the nearest rural locality.

References 

Rural localities in Zilairsky District